A coherent perfect absorber (CPA), or anti-laser, is a device which absorbs coherent light and converts it to some form of internal energy such as heat or electrical energy. It is the time-reversed counterpart of a laser. The concept was first published in the July 26, 2010, issue of Physical Review Letters, by a team at Yale University led by theorist A. Douglas Stone and experimental physicist Hui W. Cao. In the September 9, 2010, issue of Physical Review A, Stefano Longhi of Polytechnic University of Milan showed how to combine a laser and an anti-laser in a single device. In February 2011 the team at Yale built the first working anti-laser. It is a two-channel CPA device which absorbs the output of two lasers, but only when the beams have the correct phases and amplitudes. The initial device absorbed 99.4 percent of all incoming light, but the team behind the invention believe it will be possible to achieve 99.999 percent.
Originally with the FP cavity, the optical CPA operates to a specific frequency and the wavelength-thick material. In January 2012, thin-film CPA has been proposed by utilizing the achromatic dispersion of metal, exhibiting the unparalleled bandwidth and thin profile advantages. This theoretical evaluation was experimentally demonstrated in 2014.

Design
In the initial design, identical lasers are fired into a cavity containing a silicon wafer, a light-absorbing material that acts as a "loss medium". The wafer aligns the light waves from the lasers so they become trapped, causing most of the photons to bounce back and forth until they are absorbed and transformed into heat. Furthermore, many of the remaining light waves are cancelled out by interfering with each other.  In contrast, a normal laser uses a gain medium which amplifies light instead of absorbing it.

Applications
Coherent perfect absorbers can be used to build absorptive interferometers, which could be useful in detectors, transducers, and optical switches. Another potential application is in radiology, where the principle of the CPA might be used to precisely target electromagnetic radiation inside human tissues for therapeutic or imaging purposes.

References

Photonics
Quantum optics